The Suwannee River Stakes is a Thoroughbred horse race run at Gulfstream Park located in Hallandale Beach, Florida. Open to fillies and mares four-year-olds and up, the Grade III event is set at a distance of 9 furlongs or one and one eighth mile on the turf. The Suwannee River currently offers a purse of $125,000 and is run under allowance weight conditions. Prior to 2009, it was run as a Handicap

The race itself was named after Stephen Foster's song "Old Folks at Home" (known better by the name "Suwannee River"). It is now the state of Florida's state song.

The race was inaugurated in 1947. It was held as an overnight handicap between 1948 and 1950–1952. The race was not held in 1949. It was given grade-three status from 1973–1978 and again from 1982–present. The race had been run at six furlongs, seven furlongs, one mile, one and one sixteenth miles and its current distance of one and one eighth miles. The race itself has been so popular among trainers that the race has been run in two divisions many years and in three divisions in three separate years.

Records
Speed record: 
 1-1/8 miles – 1:45.38 – Dickinson (2017)
 1-1/16 miles – 1:45.10 – Vigorous Lady  (1991)
 1-mile – 1:34.60 – Jabot  (1976)
 7 furlongs – 1:22.40- Airmans Guide  (1961)

Most wins by a jockey:
 6 – Jerry D. Bailey (1983, 1984, 1992, 1993, 1995, 1997)
 5 – Craig Perret (1979, 1982, 1987, 1988, 1989)
 4 – Jean-Luc Samyn (1981, 1981, 1986 & 2003)

Most wins by a trainer:
 5 – Christophe Clement (1995, 2003, 2005, 2007, 2008)
 4 – Thomas J. Skiffington Jr. (1987, 1988, 1989, 2001)
 4 – Harry Trotsek (1955, 1977, 1982 & 1984)

Most wins by an owner:
 4 – Edward A. Seltzer (1982, 1984, 1987, 1989)

Winners 

A # designates that the race was run in multiple divisions that year.

References

Horse races in the United States
Graded stakes races in the United States
Gulfstream Park